Kürkənd or Kyurtkend or Kurdkand may refer to:
Kürkənd, Nakhchivan, Azerbaijan
Kürkənd, Neftchala, Azerbaijan
Kurdkand, Iran